NK Krk is a Croatian association football club founded in 1940 and based in the town of Krk on the island of Krk.

External links
Official website 
NK Krk 

Association football clubs established in 1940
Football clubs in Croatia
1940 establishments in Croatia
Football clubs in Primorje-Gorski Kotar County